Powell-Redmond House is a historic home located at Clifton, Mason County, West Virginia.  It was built in 1866, and is a -story red brick residence in the Italianate-style.  It has a rear ell and features floor-length, doublehung, first story windows with heavy segmental stone lintels.  The interior has a ballroom with a variety of intact ornamental plasterwork.  It was built by William Henry Powell (1825–1904), who had established the Clifton Iron & Nail Company in 1866. Powell was a general in the American Civil War who fought mostly in West Virginia and Virginia.

It was listed on the National Register of Historic Places in 1983.

References

Houses on the National Register of Historic Places in West Virginia
Italianate architecture in West Virginia
Houses completed in 1866
Houses in Mason County, West Virginia
National Register of Historic Places in Mason County, West Virginia
1866 establishments in West Virginia